Talkhari-ye Bandar-e Deligerdu (also Romanized as Talkhārī-ye Bandar-e Delīgerdū; also known as Talkhārī-ye Bandar) is a village in Margown Rural District, Margown District, Boyer-Ahmad County, Kohgiluyeh and Boyer-Ahmad Province, Iran. At the 2006 census, its population was 33, in 5 families.

References 

Populated places in Boyer-Ahmad County